Pietro Mario Pastore, also known as Piero Pastore (3 April 1908, in Padua – 8 January 1968, in Rome) was an Italian professional footballer who played as a striker; he later became an actor.

Football career
Pastore was the youngest ever player to play for Juventus F.C. at the age of 15 years, 222 days. He played for 6 seasons (108 games, 46 goals) in the Serie A for S.S. Lazio, A.C. Milan and A.S. Roma. Pastore represented Italy at the 1928 Summer Olympics and won bronze medal, but he did not play in any games.

Acting career
After retirement, he became an actor, among other roles, he played small parts in Roman Holiday, Barabbas and War and Peace.

Honours

Club
Juventus
Italian Football Championship: 1925–26

International 
Italy
Olympic Bronze Medal: 1928

Selected filmography

 Girls Do Not Joke (1929)
 La Leggenda di Wally (1930) - Hagenbach
 Ninna nanna delle dodici mamme (1930)
 Steel (1933) - Mario Velini
 Trois balles dans la peau (1934) - Policeman #2
 Port (1934) - Salvatore - il fidanzato di Maria
 Aldebaran (1935) - Sailor
 Territorial Militia (1935) - Il soldato Grotta
 Tredici uomini e un cannone (1936) - Uomo #7
 Tonight at Eleven (1938) - Willy
 Under the Southern Cross (1938) - Casale
 I, His Father (1939) - Sandro
 An Adventure of Salvator Rosa (1939) - Il quarto contadino
 Fanfulla da Lodi (1940) - Marco
 Fortuna (1940)
 The Siege of the Alcazar (1940) - (uncredited)
 Caravaggio, il pittore maledetto (1941)
 Orizzonte dipinto (1941)
 The Iron Crown (1941) - Sestio (uncredited)
 Oro nero (1942) - Marco, il marinaio
 Giarabub (1942) - Il tenente Martini
 Il fanciullo del West (1943) - William Donovan
 The Man with a Cross (1943) - Beyrov
 Il treno crociato (1943) - Corsi - detto 'Lanciafiamme' (uncredited)
 La donna della montagna (1944) - L'assistente di Rodolfo
 In High Places (1945) - Bottaccini (uncredited)
 Two Anonymous Letters (1945) - Il secondo reduco sul treno (uncredited)
 The Black Eagle (1946)
 Eleven Men and a Ball (1948)
 Anthony of Padua (1949) - Giano
 The Beggar's Daughter (1950)
 His Last Twelve Hours (1950) - Un sindacalista
 Il monello della strada (1950) - Un altro minatore
 Behind Closed Shutters (1951) - Cinque (uncredited)
 The Crossroads (1951) - De Vecchi
 Revenge of the Pirates (1951) - Escuedo
 Senza bandiera (1951)
 Lorenzaccio (1951)
 When in Rome (1952) - Customs Man (uncredited)
 Red Shirts (1952) - Pietro Fadini
 The Secret of Three Points (1952) - Riccardo Albertini
 The Captain of Venice (1952) - Barbaro Corazza
 The Three Pirates (1952) - Capitaine du Galion
 Roman Holiday (1953) - Faceless Man on the Barge (uncredited)
 Legione straniera (1953) - Il Baro ai Dadi
 Anni facili (1953)
 The Ship of Condemned Women (1953) - Pedro - un ufficiale
 Condannatelo! (1953)
 Ulysses (1954) - Leocrito (uncredited)
 Uomini ombra (1954) - (uncredited)
 Bread, Love and Jealousy (1954) - Minor Role (uncredited)
 Cardinal Lambertini (1954) - Papal messenger
 Loves of Three Queens (1954) - Simone (segment: The Face That Launched a Thousand Ships)
 Attila (1954) - Tribal Leader
 Too Bad She's Bad (1954) - L'infermiere (uncredited)
 The Art of Getting Along (1954) - Padre di Lilli (uncredited)
 Suonno d'ammore (1955) - The Fisherman Marcello
 Storia di una minorenne (1956)
 War and Peace (1956) - Bolkonsky's Servant (uncredited)
 The Knight of the Black Sword (1956) - Sebastiano
 Amaramente (1956) - Police Officer (uncredited)
 Operazione notte (1957)
 Engaged to Death (1957)
 Io, Caterina (1957)
 Toto and Marcellino (1958) - (uncredited)
 Gagliardi e pupe (1958) - Sor Ezio
 Carosello di canzoni (1958) - Direttore night club
 Fantasmi e ladri (1959) - The Police Officer Who Arrests Edmondo Natale (uncredited)
 World of Miracles (1959) - Un altro capostazione
 The Black Archer (1959) - Old conspirator
 General Della Rovere (1959) - Prisoner (uncredited)
 Simpatico mascalzone (1959) - sor Augusto
 Il raccomandato di ferro (1959) - The Furniture Dealer (uncredited)
 The Employee (1959) - The Office Clerk with a Pocket Handkerchief (uncredited)
 Carthage in Flames (1960)
 Gentlemen Are Born (1960)
 Goliath and the Dragon (1960) - Prison Guard
 The Giants of Thessaly (1960) - Cittadino di Jolco (uncredited)
 Sword in the Shadows (1961) - Guardia carceraria
 The Prisoner of the Iron Mask (1961)
 Some Like It Cold (1961) - Partisan at the Funeral (uncredited)
 Queen of the Seas (1961) - Protocol instructor
 Barabbas (1961) - Nicodemus (uncredited)
 Dieci italiani per un tedesco (Via Rasella) (1962)
 The Secret Mark of D'Artagnan (1962)
 Il naufrago del Pacifico (1962)
 Tiger of the Seven Seas (1962) - Pirate (uncredited)
 I Am Semiramis (1963) - Shabli
 The Invincible Masked Rider (1963) - Fratello dell'appestato
 Goliath and the Sins of Babylon (1963) - Farmer Witness
 Hercules and the Masked Rider (1963) - Prison's Head Guard
 Thunder of Battle (1964) - Furio
 Messalina vs. the Son of Hercules (1964) - British Ambassador (uncredited)
 Hercules, Prisoner of Evil (1964) - Amko
 Sword of the Empire (1964) - Ottavio
 El diablo también llora (1965)
 Me, Me, Me... and the Others (1966) - (uncredited)
 Wild, Wild Planet (1966) - Scientist on Planet Delfos
 Il pianeta errante (1966) - Older Officer at Conference
 La morte viene dal pianeta Aytin (1967) - Older Officer (final film role)

References

1908 births
1968 deaths
Italian footballers
Italian male film actors
Serie A players
Calcio Padova players
Juventus F.C. players
A.C. Milan players
S.S. Lazio players
A.C. Perugia Calcio players
A.S. Roma players
Footballers at the 1928 Summer Olympics
Olympic footballers of Italy
Olympic bronze medalists for Italy
Olympic medalists in football
20th-century Italian male actors
Association football forwards
Medalists at the 1928 Summer Olympics